Charles Souza Chad (born 31 December 1981) is a Brazilian professional footballer who is currently a play for Macaé. He previously played for Perlis FA as a forward.

References

External links 
 

1981 births
Living people
Association football forwards
FC Porto players
Friburguense Atlético Clube players
Aragua FC players
A.C.C.D. Mineros de Guayana players
Tianjin Jinmen Tiger F.C. players
Associação Desportiva Cabofriense players
Ceará Sporting Club players
C.D. Trofense players
Bangu Atlético Clube players
Campinense Clube players
Macaé Esporte Futebol Clube players
Duque de Caxias Futebol Clube players
Sociedade Esportiva e Recreativa Caxias do Sul players
PDRM FA players
Perak F.C. players
Segunda Divisão players
Expatriate footballers in China
Chinese Super League players
Liga Portugal 2 players
Footballers from Rio de Janeiro (city)
Brazilian footballers